Charles Knox (born 1929) is an American composer.

Charles Knox may also refer to:
 Charles B. Knox (died 1908), founder of the Charles B. Knox Gelatine Co., Inc., husband of Rose Knox
 Charles Edmond Knox (1846–1938), Anglo-Irish soldier of the British Army
 Chuck Knox (1932–2018), football coach
 Sir Charles Knox-Gore, 2nd Baronet (1831–1890) of the Knox-Gore baronets
 Charles Knox (priest) (1770–1825), Archdeacon of Armagh